Qamata is the most prominent God among the Xhosa-speaking people of South-Eastern Africa. Qamata is the creator and protector of heaven and earth. Qamata is the all knowing and omnipresent God in the third dimension. In the second dimension lives ancestors who ceased to be in the physical realm and are guardians of humans living on earth. It is believed that - during their existence in the physical world and by the instruction of Qamata - ancestors created spiritual entities that would be responsible for guiding human life on earth. Humans may not see them, but they appear spiritually, in dreams or a chosen person sees them in the day. They appear in the form of figures humans can physically recognise e.g. a fish, snake, lion or bee. These entities exist separately from the creatures which they possess and have a clear identity of their own. Their intended existence was not only guidance, but also a form of communication between the physical and spiritual realms. In return, humans identifying as part of the Xhosa tribe would then perform a spiritual ritual as confirmation that the message has been received, the necessary steps have been taken and also to receive the blessings which Qamata has given. The Xhosa symbolism for Qamata is the Sun as it represents the cycle of life, from birth to adulthood to death and rebirth in African Spirituality. The symbolism of Qamata is a depiction of the power of African spiritual imagery on the human mind and the consciousness of the Xhosa people. The image inspires the conception that Qamata created all things, is all powerful and all knowing. The Xhosa God has neither part nor lot so far as physical appearance(gender, colour etc.), alleviating the ideology of a God being superior to human life but rather encouraging human potential and discouraging the assumption that you are inferior to your own characteristics.

References
Theal, George McCall.  Kaffir Folk-lore: A Selection from the Traditional Tales. 1886: London.

African gods
Xhosa culture